Sullivan County, Pennsylvania, United States, is divided into 13 incorporated municipalities. State law defines the two kinds of municipalities present in the county: four boroughs and nine townships. In the 2010 census, the population of Sullivan County was 6,428, making it an "Eighth Class County", defined by Pennsylvania law as "having a population of less than 20,000 inhabitants". Its county seat is Laporte, which was the smallest county seat in Pennsylvania by population, as of 2001.

Cherry Township has the highest population of any municipality (1,705 or 26.5% of the county total as of 2010), while the borough of Eagles Mere has the lowest population (120 or 1.9%).

Although Sullivan County has boroughs and townships, it has no cities. Any municipality in Pennsylvania with more than 10 persons can incorporate as a borough. Any township or borough with a population of at least 10,000 can ask the state legislature to become chartered as a city. However, as Sullivan County has a population of only 6,428, it has no cities. There are no unincorporated areas in the county, since all territory in Pennsylvania is incorporated.

History
The land which became Sullivan County was purchased from the Iroquois by the Province of Pennsylvania in 1768, as part of the first Treaty of Fort Stanwix. It was part of Northumberland County, then became part of Lycoming County when it was formed in 1795. Sullivan County itself was formed from the northeastern part of Lycoming County on March 15, 1847. It was the thirteenth and last county formed at least partly from Lycoming County, and the fifth entirely formed from it.

According to the official state publication The Pennsylvania Manual (2011), Sullivan County was named for Pennsylvania state senator Charles C. Sullivan, who "took an active part in procuring passage of the bill" establishing the county. However, according to former Pennsylvania state librarian Frederic A. Godcharles (1933) and oliver P. Williams' County Courthouses of Pennsylvania: A Guide (2001), the county is named for General John Sullivan, who led the Sullivan Expedition against the Iroquois in 1779.

While all four boroughs were formed after Sullivan County was established, seven of the nine townships were formed while still part of Lycoming County. The first of these was Shrewsbury Township, which encompassed all of modern Sullivan County when it was formed in 1803. Elkland Township was formed from Shrewsbury in 1804, as were Cherry (1824), Davidson (1833), and Forks Townships (1833). Plunketts Creek Township was formed from Franklin and Davidson Townships in 1838, and Fox Township was formed from Elkland in 1839. When Sullivan County was formed in 1847, both Shrewsbury and Plunketts Creek Townships were split, with each county having a township of that name. Plunketts Creek Township in Sullivan County changed its name to Hillsgrove Township in 1856. Sullivan County has no former townships, and no counties have been formed from it.

When formed in 1847, Sullivan County had no boroughs. The unincorporated village of Cherry Hill in Cherry Township served as the first county seat until 1850, when Laporte was founded in the geographic center of the county, and became its new county seat. In 1850 the population of the county was 3,694 and it grew steadily to a peak of 12,134 in 1900. This was just after the borough of Eagles Mere was incorporated as the last of the county's municipalities, in 1899. Much of this growth was fueled by lumber-based industry, but the virgin forests were almost all gone by 1900 and the population declined in eight of eleven decades since then, decreasing by a total of 47% between 1900 and 2010.

Municipalities

Clickable map
The map shown below is clickable; click on any municipality name to be redirected to the article for that borough or township.

See also
 Loyalsock State Forest
 Worlds End State Park
 Ricketts Glen State Park

References
Unless otherwise noted, all information on area and population comes from the U.S. Census Bureau.

External links
  Official Sullivan County Website
 

Sullivan County, Pennsylvania, Municipalities
Municipalities in Sullivan County
Pennsylvania